

By transaction amount 
Below lists some of the most expensive houses in Hong Kong which have been sold. Houses which have high listing prices but have not yet been sold are not included. Additionally, houses which were bundled together and sold in one transaction are also not included. Selling price is at the time of transaction, and is not adjusted for inflation.

By valuation 
Below are the top 10 most expensive houses in Hong Kong. Prices (valuation) are based on best estimates in 2022. Factors determining prices include location, view, built quality, past transactions, media reports and annual figures published by Rating and Valuation Department of the Government. Rankings are based on per square foot. Note other houses under the table with values close to ones within the top 10 list.

Below are houses with prices/valuation close to the above listings (in random order): 22 Middle Gap Road (owned by Robert Miller), 50 Repulse Bay Road (owned by Sonny Yeung), 350 Tai Hang Road (family of Sir Po sing-woo), Big Wave Road (Richard Li), 99 Repulse Bay Road (Lee Kum Kee), 7 Black's Link (Law's), 15 Mt Cameron Rd, 3 Deep Water Bay Road

References